Corallus batesii, also known commonly as the  Amazon Basin emerald tree boa, is a species of snake in the subfamily Boinae of the family Boidae. The species is native to the tropical rainforests of South America. This species was revalidated from the synonymy of Corallus caninus by Henderson and colleagues in 2009.

Taxonomy and etymology
English naturalist John Edward Gray originally described this species as Chrysenis batesii in 1860. The specific name, batesii, is in honor of Henry Walter Bates, an English naturalist and explorer, for whom Batesian mimicry is also named.

Description
The Amazon Basin emerald tree boa has a yellow belly. The dorsum is dark green with an enamel-white vertebral stripe, which has confluent partial crossbars, often bordered by some black spots. C. batesii differs from C. caninus by the shape and the number of scales across the snout. C. batesii is bigger than C. caninus, growing to a total length (including tail) approaching .

Behavior
Corallus batesii is arboreal, and it is both diurnal and nocturnal.

Diet

Corallus batesii is capable of hunting small airborne prey, such as bats and birds.

Reproduction
Corallus batesii is ovoviviparous.

Geographic range and habitat
Corallus batesii, the "Amazon Basin species", as the common name suggests, is only found in the basin of the Amazon River, in southern Suriname, southern Venezuela to Colombia, Ecuador, Peru and Brazil and in the surrounding jungles of the Amazon River.

References

batesii
Snakes of South America
Reptiles of Bolivia
Reptiles of Brazil
Reptiles of Colombia
Reptiles of Ecuador
Reptiles of Peru
Taxa named by John Edward Gray